Seysses is a commune in the Haute-Garonne department, southwestern France.

It is located 19 km south of Toulouse and 5 km north of Muret.

Population

See also
Communes of the Haute-Garonne department

References

External links

Official site

Communes of Haute-Garonne